Gabriel Rodríguez may refer to:

Gabriel Rodríguez Aguiló (born 1973), Puerto Rican politician
Gabriel Rodríguez (Argentine footballer) (born 1989), footballer currently playing for Audax Italiano of the Primera División in Chile
Gabriel Rodríguez (canoeist) (born 1979), Venezuelan sprint canoer
Gabriel Rodrigues dos Santos (born 1981), Brazilian footballer
Gabriel Rodriguez (artist) (born 1976), Chilean comic book artist